Christian Strøm Steen (21 May 1854 – 1932) was a Norwegian businessman.

He was born in Kristiania as a son of wholesaler Peter Emil Steen (1829–1884) and Ovidia Laurenze Jebe (1829–1905). He was a brother of Johan Steen and Emil Steen. He was also an uncle of Erling and Fredrik Steen.

In 1884 he married Lilli Bing, daughter of a timber merchant in Fredrikstad. They had the sons Nils and Emil Steen.

He finished his secondary education in 1872. He took commercial education in England, Germany and France and worked as a timber merchant in Fredrikstad before becoming a co-owner of Steen & Strøm. The company was owned by his father and the Strøm family. When his father died in 1884, Christian Strøm Steen became partner together with Johan Steen and Christian Strøm, Jr. The next generation of owners took over in the 1910s. He died in 1932.

References

1854 births
1932 deaths
Businesspeople from Oslo
Norwegian businesspeople in retailing